Hollandichthys multifasciatus is a species of characin native to tropical South America. It inhabits coastal rivers of southern Brazil, where it occurs from the state of Rio de Janeiro to the state of Rio Grande do Sul.  Although there are claimed records from Uruguay, these are likely erroneous.

This species can reach  in standard length. It has been reported to feed on insects (both aquatic and terrestrial), decapods, oligochaetes, spiders, and plant material.

References

Characidae
Fish of Brazil
Taxa named by Carl H. Eigenmann
Fish described in 1900